Ulrike Müßig (née Seif, born 1968 in Würzburg) is a German jurist and legal historian as well as Head of the Chair for Civil Law, German and European Legal History at the University of Passau.

Life 
Ulrike Müßig studied law at the University of Würzburg (DE) and Cambridge (GB) as well as at the University Paris II, Pantheon-Assas (FR) as a visiting student. She was promoted by the scholarship program for highly gifted students of the Bavarian Hundhammerstiftung, the German National Academic Foundation (Studienstiftung des Deutschen Volkes) and the study abroad scholarship of the DAAD. After the First State Examination in 1993, she received the doctoral scholarship of the Studienstiftung at the Institute for Comparative Law at the University of Würzburg and at the Max-Planck-Institute for foreign and international private law at Hamburg until she was awarded her doctorate in 1995 for submitting the thesis Der Bestandsschutz besitzloser Mobiliarsicherheiten im deutschen und englischen Recht (Unauthorized Dispositions of Assets serving as Security, Comparative Aspects of Non-possessory Security Rights over Movables in English and German Law). Having carried out her traineeship for her Assesorexamen in Würzburg, Brussels and Paris, she became postdoctoral scholar at the Institute for Bavarian and German Legal History at the University of Würzburg under Professor Dietmar Willoweit from 1996 to 1999.
In 2000, she completed her postdoctoral qualification (habilitation) at the Law Faculty of the University of Würzburg in the areas of European and German Legal history, Civil Law, Comparative Law and International Private Law with a work on Legal History, receiving the Heisenberg Prize of the DFG (German Research Foundation). Her habilitation Recht und Justizhoheit, Der gesetzliche Richter im historischen Vergleich von der Kanonistik bis zur Europäischen Menschenrechtskonvention, unter besonderer Berücksichtigung der Rechtsentwicklung in Deutschland, England und Frankreich was published in the second edition. In the same year, Ulrike Müßig was appointed to the Chair for Civil Law and German and European Legal History at the University of Passau, rejecting an offered chair at the University of Bielefeld. An offer of the University of Bern was rejected in 2003. From 2010 to 2012, Müßig was Dean of the Faculty of Law of the University of Passau.
The focus of her scientific work is to be found in the European Constitutional History from the 12th to the 21st century including the contemporary history of the European integration, the history of supreme jurisdiction, the Roman-canonical law of succession in medieval German legal recordings as well as the history of ideas of the 18th century. She contributed heavily to the manuals of German Legal History, the Encyclopaedia of Modern Age and the Oxford International Encyclopaedia of Legal History. She is co-author of the Grundlagen der Rechtswissenschaft (Foundations of Legal Science) together with Horst Dreier and Michael Stolleis published by Mohr Siebeck. 
What is characteristic for her work is the goal to maintain the historical disciplines as a part of legal education, to create conditions for interdisciplinary research as well as to enable an international exchange of ideas and the promotion of graduates.

Distinctions 
Due to her scientific achievements, Ulrike Müßig was awarded the Bavarian Habilitation Prize 1996 (Bayerischen Habilitationsförderpreis 1996), the Prize of the Lower Franconian Gedenkjahresstiftung for Science 1997 (Preis der Unterfränkischen Gedenkjahresstiftung für Wissenschaft 1997) and the Heisenberg Prize of the DFG 2000. In 2008, she was nominated for the Gerda-Henkel-Prize. Since 2014 she is a corresponding member of the National Academy al Andalus in the historic-judicial class (Ilustre Sociedad Andaluza de Estudios Histórico-Jurídicos). In 2013 Ulrike Müßig received the ERC Advanced Grant ReConFort, Reconsidering Constitutional Formation in 18th and 19th century Europe (1.9 million €) for her research project on European Constitutional History, which resulted in the creation of the ReConFort Research Blog in 2019. In April 2015 Prof. Dr. Ulrike Müßig was elected into the historical-philosophical class of the Austrian Academy of Sciences. In 2019 she was elected as professeur invité at the faculty of law of the Université Paris II Panthéon-Assas.

References

External links 
 University of Passau: Chair for Civil Law, German and European Legal History
 Curriculum Vitae
 Publications
 37. Deutscher Rechtshistorikertag
 Portrait of Ulrike Müßig in German Television

Jurists from Bavaria
Living people
Alumni of the University of Cambridge
University of Würzburg alumni
German legal scholars
1968 births
Writers from Würzburg
Legal historians
Studienstiftung alumni
Academic staff of the University of Passau